Michel Pereira may refer to:

 Michel Pereira (born 1993), Brazilian mixed martial artist
 Michel Garbini Pereira (born 1981), Brazilian footballer
 Michell Pereira (born 1982), Sri Lankan cricketer

See also
 Michaël Pereira (born 1987), French footballer
 Michaela Pereira (born 1970), Canadian television personality
 Michael Pereira (field hockey) (1932-2019), Kenyan field hockey player
 Mickaël Pereira (born 1991), Portuguese footballer